The 1973–1974 FIRA Trophy was the 14th edition of a European rugby union championship for national teams, and first with the formula and the name of "FIRA Trophy".

The tournament was won by France, with a Grand Slam. Romania finished in the 2nd place, with a single loss, and Spain in the 3rd place, with two wins and two losses. Italy won the Second Division, earning the right to return to the First Division for the following season.

First division 
Table

 Poland and Marocco relegated to division 2
Results

 France-Poland not played (Poland forfait)

Second Division 
Portugal withdrew from the tournament after playing only two matches due to the political situation after the Carnation Revolution.
Table

Italy and Czechoslovakia promoted to division 2

Results

Bibliography 
 Francesco Volpe, Valerio Vecchiarelli (2000), 2000 Italia in Meta, Storia della nazionale italiana di rugby dagli albori al Sei Nazioni, GS Editore (2000) .
 Francesco Volpe, Paolo Pacitti (Author), Rugby 2000, GTE Gruppo Editorale (1999).

References

External links
 FIRA-AER official website

1973–74 in European rugby union
1973-74
1973 rugby union tournaments for national teams
1974 rugby union tournaments for national teams